Gnosjö Municipality (Gnosjö kommun) is a municipality in Jönköping County, southern Sweden where the town Gnosjö is seat.

The Swedish local government reform of 1952 formed this municipality out if five former entities, and it has not been amalgamated with others since then.

About half of the municipal population live in Gnosjö town, the rest is spread between smaller localities, and rural areas.

Gnosjö is referred to as the centre of the Gnosjö region which is an area of enterprising small industries, driven by the distinctive "Gnosjö Spirit". Despite its small size of some 1,100 people at the time, it had been the subject of a book describing its customs and locals in 1906 (F.J.E. Eneström: Gnosjöboarna, deras hemslöjd, seder och lefnadssätt).

The landscape is dominated by forests. The rural areas offer good possibilities for wildlife, canoeing, fishing, hiking, etc. The Store Mosse is a national park consisting of the largest boggy ground (in Sweden) south of Lapland.

Near Hillerstorp is a small but nationally renowned amusement park called High Chaparral offering Wild West experiences. There is, in Gnosjö town, a small museum of the local industrial history, in this case a mechanical workshop.

Localities
There are seven urban areas (also called localities, Swedish: tätorter) in Gnosjö Municipality.

In the table the localities are listed according to the size of the population as of December 31, 2005. The municipal seat is in bold characters.

References

Statistics Sweden

External links

Gnosjö Municipality - Official site

Municipalities of Jönköping County